Abd al-Karim al-Karmi, (1909–11 October 1980), known as Abu Salma, was a famous  Palestinian poet and one of the Arab poets, was born in Tulkarm, and was a member of the Palestine Liberation Organization. He was the recipient of several awards and he chairman of the General Union of Palestinian Writers and Journalists until his death.

Biography
Abu Salma was born On 1909 in Tulkarm. He studied law and worked in Haifa in Mandatory Palestine until April 1948. He then moved briefly to Acre and then to Damascus. Abd al-Karim al-Karmi is the brother of Hasan Karmi, Mahmoud Al-Karmi and Abdul-Ghani Al-Karmi.

Works

Poetry
 The Exile, 1953.
 Songs of My Country, 1959.
 Children's Songs, 1964.
 My Brush Is from Palestine, 1971.
 Collected Works, 1978.

Prose
 The Struggle of the Arabs of Palestine, 1964.
 The Works of Ahmad Shakir al-Karmi: Literary, Critical and Fictional, 1964.
 Shaykh Sa‘id al-Karmi, 1973.

Death
He died of sepsis at 11 October 1980 in George Washington University Hospital in Washington, D.C.

Awards and Honors
 1978: Lotus International Reward for Literature, by The Association of Asian and African Writers, it was given by the president of Angola Agostinho Neto for him.
 1980: Order of Palestinian revolution, by the president of the Palestine Liberation Organization Yasser Arafat. 
 1990: Order of Jerusalem for Culture, Arts and Literature, by the president of the Palestine Liberation Organization Yasser Arafat.
 2015: Order of Palestine for Culture, Science and Arts, by the president of the State of Palestine Mahmoud Abbas.

References

External links
 Abd al-Karim al-Karmi.
 Link to poem of "We Will Return", Abu Salma, 1951.

1909 births
1980 deaths
Palestinian male poets
People from Tulkarm
Palestinian refugees
20th-century Palestinian poets
20th-century male writers
Palestinian jurists
Palestine Liberation Organization members
Members of the Palestinian National Council
Arab people in Mandatory Palestine
Death in Washington, D.C.